Mark Duffy may refer to:

 Mark Duffy (banker), Irish banker
 Mark Duffy (footballer) (born 1985), English footballer